The 1928 United States presidential election in Oklahoma took place on November 6, 1928, as part of the 1928 United States presidential election which was held throughout all contemporary 48 states. Voters chose ten representatives, or electors to the Electoral College, who voted for president and vice president. 

Oklahoma voted for the Republican nominee, Secretary of Commerce Herbert Hoover of California, over the Democratic nominee, Governor Alfred E. Smith of New York. Hoover's running mate was Senate Majority Leader Charles Curtis of Kansas, while Smith ran with Senator Joseph Taylor Robinson of Arkansas.

Hoover won the state by a margin of 28.28 percentage points. His large margin of victory was due to extremely powerful anti-Catholic sentiment against Smith in a state almost entirely part of the Southern Protestant “Bible Belt”. In some previously Democratic counties in southwestern Oklahoma, Hoover gained vote shares more than thirty percent higher than Calvin Coolidge had in 1924, despite the fact that Smith had visited the state in September and given a major speech on the issue of religious tolerance.

This was the first election since statehood when Oklahoma had voted more Republican than the nation at large, and the only one until 1960. Hoover carried all but eleven of Oklahoma’s 77 counties, with only culturally Southern Choctaw Country in the southeast (an area also known as "Little Dixie") remaining loyal to Smith – and even there Democratic margins were smaller than usual for the era. He was the only Republican until Richard Nixon’s 1972 landslide to carry the following counties: Carter, Cotton, Harmon, Jackson, Jefferson, Murray and Tillman. Hoover was also the first Republican presidential candidate to win the following counties: Beckham, Cleveland, Grady, Hughes, McClain and Pontotoc.

Results

Results by county

See also
 United States presidential elections in Oklahoma

References

Oklahoma
1928
1928 Oklahoma elections